Auchmera is a monotypic snout moth genus described by George Hampson in 1930. Its single species, Auchmera falsalis, was described by the same author in 1908. It is found in India.

References

Phycitinae
Monotypic moth genera
Moths of Asia